Bead tree is a common name for several plants and may refer to:

Adenanthera
Melia azedarach